John Clarke (April 14, 1931 – October 16, 2019) was an American actor. Clarke is recognized for originating and portraying Mickey Horton on the NBC soap opera Days of Our Lives for 39 years, beginning with the debut of the program in 1965, until his retirement in 2004.

In 1959, Clarke acted with Ida Lupino in an episode of CBS's The Twilight Zone titled The Sixteen-Millimeter Shrine. In the 1961-1962 television season, he was cast in 27 episodes as Patrolman Joe Huddleston in Leslie Nielsen's ABC crime drama series, The New Breed.

His daughter is actress Melinda Clarke, who started out on Days of our Lives and later played Julie Cooper on the television series, The O.C.

Clarke died on October 16, 2019, from complications of pneumonia at the age of 88.

Awards
He was nominated for the 1979 Daytime Emmy Award for Outstanding Actor in a Daytime Drama Series for Days of Our Lives. In 2005 he was awarded the Daytime Emmys Lifetime Achievement Award

Selected filmography

Film
 Operation Bottleneck (1961) - Sgt. Marty Regan
 You Have to Run Fast (1961) - Chuck
 Gun Street (1961) - Deputy Sheriff Sam Freed
 Judgment at Nuremberg (1961) - Prison Guard (uncredited)
 It's a Mad, Mad, Mad, Mad World (1963) - Helicopter Pilot (uncredited)
 The Thin Red Line (1964) - (uncredited)
 Finger on the Trigger (1965) - Numitah
 The Satan Bug (1965) - Lt. Raskin
 Critics and Other Freaks (1997) - Curmundgeon

Television
 Gunsmoke (1959) - Tom Rutger
 Destination Space (1959, TV Movie) - Space Ship Crew
 The Twilight Zone (1959, 1 episode) - Young Jerry Hearndan
 Hawaiian Eye (1960, 1 episode) - Jablonsky
 The New Breed (1961–1962, 27 episodes) - Officer Joe Huddleston
 Death Valley Days (1960–1968, 7 episodes) - Reverend Peter Green / Fred Gilmer / Maurice Dory / Bill Crawford / Virgil Earp / Harlow / Mark Kellogg / Will Skidmore
 Days of Our Lives (1965–2004) - Mickey Horton (final appearance)

References

External links

1931 births
2019 deaths
American male soap opera actors
American male television actors
Male actors from Indiana
Actors from South Bend, Indiana